Franklin Township is a township in Washington County, Iowa, USA.

History
Franklin Township was established in 1854.

References

Townships in Washington County, Iowa
Townships in Iowa
1854 establishments in Iowa